Marwick is a Scottish surname, that may refer to:

Arthur Marwick (1936–2006), Scottish historian 
Ernest Marwick (1915–1977), Scottish writer 
Hugh Marwick (1885–1965), Scottish scholar
James Marwick (born 1862), founder of accountancy practice KPMG
John Marwick (1891–1978), New Zealand palaeontologist and geologist
Thomas Marwick (1895–1960), Australian politician
Thomas P. Marwick (1854–1927), Scottish architect
Tricia Marwick (born 1953), Scottish politician
Warren Marwick (1869–1955), Australian politician
William Marwick (1833–1925), Western Australian settler